Kilbirnie (from ) is a suburb of Wellington in New Zealand,  to the south-east of the city centre. Travellers can reach Kilbirnie from the Wellington central business district via the Mount Victoria Tunnel and Hataitai, or over Mount Victoria, or around the coast.

Kilbirnie sits on the eastern flank of the ridge which becomes Mount Victoria and on the flat of the Rongotai isthmus between Evans Bay to the north (part of Port Nicholson) and Lyall Bay to the south (on Cook Strait). No clear boundaries separate Kilbirnie from its neighbouring suburbs, with the exception of the town belt to the west which separates Kilbirnie from Newtown.

Etymology

Kilbirnie takes its name after the town of Kilbirnie in Scotland. It was named by Coutts Crawford, who initially owned the land. Two streets in the area are named for him.

Activities 

The suburb features a shopping area, the Wellington Regional Aquatic Centre, the ASB Sports Centre, a recreation centre, a public library, and a sports field, Kilbirnie Park.

Kilbirnie hosts the only mosque in Wellington City. There is also a Hindu temple located in Kilbirnie, which serves as the headquarters for the Wellington Indian Association. There is a catholic church, St Patrick's, next to St Patrick's primary school in Childers Terrace. St Giles church in Kilbirnie Crescent was used for Presbyterian services until 2013 and after that served the Niuean community, but it closed in 2019 due to earthquake risk.

The majority of the population live in single-storey dwellings, but with a growing population, a business centre and proximity to the airport and to the city centre, the suburb also has a few hotels and apartment buildings, such as the Brentwood Hotel, 747 Motel and Rongotai Apartments.

Sport 

Kilbirnie Park is home to Poneke Football Club, Poneke Kilbirnie Softball Club, Eastern Suburbs Cricket Club and Marist Association Football Club. Kilbirnie Bowling Club was situated adjacent to Kilbirnie Park but closed and was demolished around 2018. As of February 2021 Wellington City Council had plans to landscape the site. Kilbirnie Tennis Club has courts in Crawford Road. 

The ASB Sports Centre opened in Kilbirnie in 2011. It has solidified Kilbirnie's status as the most essential suburb in Wellington for sports and recreation, making Kilbirnie a likely destination for anybody wishing to play casual or competitively.

Demographics

Kilbirnie had a population of 4,842 at the 2018 New Zealand census, an increase of 39 people (0.8%) since the 2013 census, and a decrease of 48 people (-1.0%) since the 2006 census. There were 1,872 households. There were 2,349 males and 2,496 females, giving a sex ratio of 0.94 males per female, with 723 people (14.9%) aged under 15 years, 1,188 (24.5%) aged 15 to 29, 2,238 (46.2%) aged 30 to 64, and 693 (14.3%) aged 65 or older.

Ethnicities were 61.1% European/Pākehā, 12.6% Māori, 10.7% Pacific peoples, 22.1% Asian, and 7.8% other ethnicities (totals add to more than 100% since people could identify with multiple ethnicities).

The proportion of people born overseas was 34.9%, compared with 27.1% nationally.

Although some people objected to giving their religion, 42.3% had no religion, 34.9% were Christian, 7.0% were Hindu, 5.0% were Muslim, 1.8% were Buddhist and 3.8% had other religions.

Of those at least 15 years old, 1,287 (31.2%) people had a bachelor or higher degree, and 627 (15.2%) people had no formal qualifications. The employment status of those at least 15 was that 2,145 (52.1%) people were employed full-time, 513 (12.5%) were part-time, and 198 (4.8%) were unemployed.

Education

Public schools

The nearest primary schools are Kilbirnie School in Hataitai to the north and Lyall Bay School to the south.

The nearest secondary school is Rongotai College (for boys only) in Rongotai.

Catholic schools

The nearby St Catherine's College is a girls' state-integrated Catholic secondary school for Year 9 to 13 students, founded in 1950.

References

External links

 The Kilbirnie Business Network

Suburbs of Wellington City
Populated places around the Wellington Harbour